Artur Vladimirovich Rybakin (born June 24, 1971, Moscow) is a Russian scientist, founder and chief physician of the SPIKA Beauty Institute, plastic surgeon. He gained worldwide fame after becoming the first plastic surgeon to perform robotic-assisted plastic surgery using the da Vinci robotic-assisted surgical system.

Education 

In 1988-1994 he studied at the St. Petersburg State Medical University.

In 1994-1997 he worked in the clinical residency of the Department of Maxillofacial Surgery at St. Petersburg State Medical University.

In 1996-1998 completed postgraduate studies at the Department of Maxillofacial Surgery at St. Petersburg State Medical University. Then he worked as the head of the state institution "Cosmetological polyclinic No. 84"

Career 

In 2001 Artur Rybakin founded the St. Petersburg Institute of Beauty together with Valentina Nesvatova. He took the position of chief physician.

In 2004 he opened a representative office of the St. Petersburg Institute of Beauty in Moscow.

In 2014, he performed the world's first robot-assisted plastic surgery using the da Vinci robot-assisted surgical system. The operation was performed at the Moscow City Clinical Hospital No. 31, the duration of the operation was 2 hours and 30 minutes. The da Vinci apparatus consists of two units: a control panel for the operator and a four-armed automatic machine for performing a surgical operation. For the operation, Rybakin used a special remote control, on which, using 3D technology, you can see the operated area of ​​the body and control the movements of the robot's hands using special joysticks. The da Vinci system was used for the first time in plastic surgery, while now it is used by more than a hundred clinics for operations.

In 2016 he founded SPIKA, took the position of chief physician. The new clinic is located in the center of St. Petersburg, the total area of ​​all premises is over 1,500 square meters. On the basis of the SPIKA clinic, a training center for aesthetic medicine has been opened.

Science 

In 1998 he made a report at a practical-scientific conference on the topic "Rejuvenation operations in the neck and face."

In 1999 he made a presentation at a practical and scientific conference on the methods of endoscopy in aesthetic plastic surgery.

In 2000 he made a report “on the use of virtual helmets in endoscopic operations”.

In 2004 Rybakin carried out the first works in the field of genetic engineering for use in the needs of plastic surgery. He is the author of the method of tissue rejuvenation using telomeric DNA sequences.

In 2010 he made a presentation on plastic surgery in 3D format.

Media 

Artur Rybakin is a participant of the first show in Russia on plastic surgery "Formula of Beauty". Was one of two plastic surgeons involved in the project.

He also took part in the show Terribly beautiful "(MUZ-TV, 6 and 7 seasons). He took part in the program" Beauty Laboratory with Christina Orbakaite "on the TV-3 channel.

Artur Rybakin was involved in plastic surgery of famous athletes, show business stars, politicians, businessmen, for example, Elizaveta Boyarskaya, Elena Vorobey, Christina Orbakaite, Alla Pugacheva, Edita Piekha and others were operated on.

References

External links 
 Artur Rybakin in Instagram
 Artur Rybakin in Telegram

Physicians from Moscow
1971 births
Living people
Russian plastic surgeons